Preminchi Choodu ( Love someone then See) is a 1989 Telugu-language comedy film, produced by Silk Smitha under the Essar Cine Enterprises banner and directed by Trivuraneni Varaprasad. It stars Rajendra Prasad, Chandra Mohan,  Silk Smitha with music composed by Raj–Koti.

Plot
The film begins on two neighbors Chowdary (Kota Srinivasa Rao) & Sastry (Suthi Veerabhadra Rao), though they are good friends the men contracts caste barrier in between them. Here Chowdary's son Chitti Babu (Rajendra Prasad) and Sastry's daughter Satyabhama (Silk Smitha) fall in love. Chitti always goes into an illusion that he can view Lord Brahma (Satyanarayana). He even feels that the Lord has cursed him to set apart from his love interest and also creating obstructions to them. Meanwhile, Sastry decides to couple up Satya with his nephew Mohan (Chandra Mohan) who too is facing some adversity. As he is a beau of a Christian girl Jyothi (Poornima), daughter of a multi-millionaire David Gopal Rao (Nutan Prasad) and Mary (Y. Vijaya). The rest of the story is how both couples convince their elders and fight against caste & community systems in society.

Cast
Rajendra Prasad as Chitti Babu
Chandra Mohan as Mohan
Silk Smitha as Satyabhama
Satyanarayana as Lord Brahma
Suthi Veerabhadra Rao as Sastry
Nutan Prasad as David Gopal Rao
Kota Srinivasa Rao as Chowdary
Ali
Sakshi Ranga Rao
Mada as Venkatapaiah
Dr. Siva Prasad as Anjineelu
Poornima as Jyothi
Sri Lakshmi
Radha Kumari 
Kakinada Shyamala as Annapurna
Y. Vijaya as Mary

Soundtrack

Music composed by Raj–Koti. Music released on LEO Audio Company.

References

1980s Telugu-language films
Films scored by Raj–Koti